{{DISPLAYTITLE:C7H12O}}
The molecular formula C7H12O (molar mass 112.17 g/mol) may refer to:

 Cycloheptanone
 Norborneols
 endo-Norborneol
 exo-Norborneol

Molecular formulas